Damien Gareth Walters (born 6 April 1982) is a British freerunner and former gymnast from Derbyshire who specializes in tumbling and trampoline.

Career
Walters participated in four Trampoline World Championships. In 2003, he was one of four members of the British team winning the World Title in the team competition. In the years 2001 and 2007, he ranked 4th with the team. He also finished 5th in singles competition in 2003 and 2005.

Since 2007, Walters has not participated in further tournaments and has focused on his other projects, mainly his career as a stuntman. He also appeared in a number of television commercials and has performed in acrobatic shows.

Walters has had the role of stunt double or stunt performer in the films: Hellboy II: The Golden Army, Ninja Assassin, Scott Pilgrim vs. the World, The Eagle, I Am Number Four, Blitz, Colombiana, Sherlock Holmes: A Game of Shadows, and Captain America: The First Avenger. In Kick-Ass, he was credited as both a stunt double and assistant fight coordinator. He also appeared in the films 47 Ronin and Kingsman: The Secret Service.

In 2010, he won the Taurus World Stunt Awards for "Best Fight" in the film Ninja Assassin.

Walters also has a passion for Freerunning where he incorporates his gymnastic skills as well as his stuntman abilities. On YouTube, he is one of the most watched freerunners, with his videos having a total of over 130 million views.

Currently, Walters is running his own gym, Derby City Gymnastics Club in Derby and shooting films.

Filmography

Further reading

References

External links

British male trampolinists
Traceurs
British stunt performers
Living people
1982 births
People from Derby
Sportspeople from Derbyshire
Freerunners
21st-century British people